Sunday Shalom is a Christian weekly newspaper published in both Malayalam and English languages. It is considered as the first weekly newspaper in Malayalam language. The newspaper was established in 1999 with the aim of educating people about Catholic Church and other Christian Churches and various areas of Christian life. The newspaper covers religious events and articles from worldwide.

History as Timeline
 1989 : A small group of men, under the leadership of Benny Punnathara, starts informal prayer gathering
 1991 : Shalom Times first magazine in Malayalam starts publishing
 1996 : Shalom Tidings first English magazine starts publishing
 1997 : Launched Shalom internet ministry – reaching all world
 1998 : Shalom Vision starts telecasting; and entry into Television broadcasting
 1999 : Sunday Shalom, a weekly newspaper is published in Malayalam
 2005 : Shalom Television broadcasting 24/7
 2010 : Sunday Shalom starts publishing from USA with English and Malayalam features

Publications

Other Foundations
 Shalom Television
 Sophia Books
 Shalom Institute of Media Sciences
 Shalom Mobile Bookstore

References

External links
 Official Website of Shalom Trust
 Official Blog of Rev.Fr.Roy Palatty CMI, General editor of Sunday Shalom

Malayalam-language newspapers
Christian newspapers
Catholic newspapers
Publications established in 1999
Weekly newspapers published in India
Sunday newspapers
English-language newspapers published in India
Christian media in Kerala